The 2016 ATP Shenzhen Open was a professional men's tennis tournament played on hard courts. It was the third edition of the tournament, and part of the ATP World Tour 250 series of the 2016 ATP World Tour.  It took place at the Shenzhen Longgang Tennis Centre in Shenzhen, China from September 26 to October 2.

Singles main draw entrants

Seeds

 1 Rankings are as of September 19, 2016

Other entrants
The following players received wildcards into the singles main draw:
  Li Zhe
  Akira Santillan
  Zhang Ze

The following players received entry using a protected ranking:
  Pablo Andújar
  Janko Tipsarević

The following players received entry from the qualifying draw:
  Ryan Harrison 
  Luca Vanni
  Andrew Whittington 
  Mischa Zverev

The following player received entry as a lucky loser:
  Thomas Fabbiano

Withdrawals
Before the tournament
  Alexandr Dolgopolov →replaced by  Íñigo Cervantes
  Daniel Evans →replaced by  Lukáš Rosol
  Taylor Fritz →replaced by  Yoshihito Nishioka
  Alexander Zverev →replaced by  Thomas Fabbiano

Retirements
  Janko Tipsarević

Doubles main draw entrants

Seeds

 1 Rankings are as of September 19, 2016

Other entrants 
The following pairs received wildcards into the doubles main draw:
  Gong Maoxin /  Zhang Ze
  Li Zhe /  Zhang Zhizhen

Champions

Singles

 Tomáš Berdych def.  Richard Gasquet, 7–6(7–5), 6–7(2–7), 6–3

Doubles

  Fabio Fognini /  Robert Lindstedt def.  Mate Pavić /  Michael Venus, 7–6(7–4), 6–3

References

External links
Official site 

ATP Shenzhen Open
ATP Shenzhen Open
ATP Shenzhen Open
ATP Shenzhen Open
ATP Shenzhen Open